Viktor Nikolaevich Gavrikov (29 July 1957 – 27 April 2016) was a Lithuanian-Swiss chess player. He was awarded the title of Grandmaster by FIDE in 1984.

Gavrikov shared first place with Gintautas Piešina in the 1978 Lithuanian Championship in Vilnius. In 1983 he won the under-26 Soviet championship. Two years later he jointly won the 52nd Soviet Championship with Mikhail Gurevich and Alexander Chernin in Riga, and tied for second place in the 1986 event, won by Vitaly Tseshkovsky. In 1988, Gavrikov tied for first place with Anatoly Karpov in the World Active Championship, held in Mazatlán, Mexico, finishing second on tiebreak.

After the collapse of the Soviet Union, he emigrated to Switzerland. He won the Grandmaster Tournament of the Biel Chess Festival in 1994, and the Swiss Championship at Arosa in 1996.
He tied for first with Viktorija Čmilytė, Darius Ruzele, Aloyzas Kveinys, Vaidas Sakalauskas and Vytautas Slapikas in the Lithuanian Championship of 2000, taking third place on countback.

Gavrikov spent the last years of his life in Bulgaria, where he moved to in 2010.

References

External links
Viktor Gavrikov chess games at 365Chess.com

1957 births
2016 deaths
Chess grandmasters
Lithuanian chess players
Lithuanian emigrants to Switzerland
People from Criuleni District
Soviet chess players
Swiss chess players